SK Dolní Kounice is a Czech football club from the town of Dolní Kounice, most notable for its participation in the Czech 2. Liga in the 2002–03 season. It currently plays in the III. třída, skupina B – Brno-venkov league, which is at level 9 of the football pyramid.

Historical names 
 1921 SK Dolní Kounice
 1948 Sokol Dolní Kounice
 1952 ZSJ STS Dolní Kounice
 1953 TJ Dynamo Dolní Kounice
 1993 SK Dolní Kounice
 1996 FC Roubina Dolní Kounice
 2000 FC Group Dolní Kounice
 2004 fusion with FC Tatran Brno-Kohoutovice
 2007 newfounding as SK Dolní Kounice

References

External links 
 Website 
 Team page at vysledky.cz 
 Team page at idnes.cz 

Association football clubs established in 1921
Football clubs in the Czech Republic
Brno-Country District